Live at Maybeck Recital Hall Volume Ten is a live solo album by pianist Kenny Barron recorded at the Maybeck Recital Hall in California in late 1990 and released on the Concord label.

Reception 

In his review on Allmusic, Richard S. Ginell noted "Producing a darker tone from the Maybeck Yamaha piano than do some other participants in the series, Kenny Barron gets a chance to flaunt a wider range of his influences than he usually does in a group format ... As usual with Maybeck, the sound of the hall's bright, brittle Yamaha piano is brilliantly captured".

Track listing 
All compositions by Kenny Barron except where noted.

 "I'm Getting Sentimental Over You" (George Bassman, Ned Washington) - 7:17
 "Witchcraft" (Cy Coleman, Carolyn Leigh) - 8:49
 "Bud-Like" - 5:35
 "Spring Is Here" (Richard Rodgers, Lorenz Hart) - 10:48 	
 "Well, You Needn't" (Thelonious Monk) - 6:50
 "Skylark" (Hoagy Carmichael, Johnny Mercer) - 8:27
 "And Then Again" - 5:29
 "Sunshower" - 10:04

Personnel 
Kenny Barron - piano

References 

Kenny Barron live albums
1991 live albums
Concord Records live albums
Live instrumental albums
Albums recorded at the Maybeck Recital Hall
Solo piano jazz albums